Jean-Paul Othniel Kessé Amangoua (born 15 December 1984 in Arrah, Ivory Coast) is an Ivorian footballer.

Career 
Amangoua started his football career with Jeunesse Club d'Abidjan and joined in June 2008 ASEC Mimosas.

International career
He represented his country at the 2007 UEMOA Tournament in Burkina Faso and was nominated for the African Nations Championship 2009 in Zambia.

References

1984 births
Ivorian footballers
Living people
ASEC Mimosas players
JC d'Abidjan players
Dubai CSC players
Al-Shahania SC players
Al-Ramtha SC players
Umm Salal SC players
Al-Markhiya SC players
Al Jeel Club players
Expatriate footballers in the United Arab Emirates
Expatriate footballers in Qatar
Expatriate footballers in Jordan
Expatriate footballers in Saudi Arabia
Ivorian expatriate sportspeople in the United Arab Emirates
Ivorian expatriate sportspeople in Qatar
Ivorian expatriate sportspeople in Saudi Arabia
People from Lagunes District
UAE First Division League players
Qatar Stars League players
Qatari Second Division players
Saudi First Division League players
Association football forwards
People from Arrah
2009 African Nations Championship players
Ivory Coast A' international footballers
2011 African Nations Championship players